Kalle Lassila (born January 23, 1985 in Veteli) is a Finnish cross-country skier who has competed since 2005. He finished tenth in the individual sprint event at the 2010 Winter Olympics in Vancouver, British Columbia, Canada.

Lassila's best finish at the FIS Nordic World Ski Championships was 11th in the sprint event at Sapporo in 2007.

His best World Cup finish was fourth in a sprint event in Finland in November 2008.

Cross-country skiing results
All results are sourced from the International Ski Federation (FIS).

Olympic Games

World Championships

World Cup

Season standings

References

External links

Official website 

1985 births
Living people
People from Veteli
Cross-country skiers at the 2010 Winter Olympics
Finnish male cross-country skiers
Olympic cross-country skiers of Finland
Sportspeople from Central Ostrobothnia
21st-century Finnish people